Portuguese Handball Third Division or "Terceira Divisão Portuguese" is the third handball league in Portugal. The best teams get promoted to Portuguese Handball Second Division.

Due to some disputes between the League and the Federation, between 2001 and 2006 Portuguese Handball Third Division or "3a Divisão Portuguesa" was the fourth handball league in Portugal.

With the ending of the League, Portuguese Handball Third Division re-assumed the position of third handball league in Portugal.

Champions

Portuguese Handball Third Division 

1978/1979 : Dramatico Cascais
1979/1980 : Dramatico Cascais (2)
1980/1981 : Salgueiros
1981/1982 : Pedro Nunes
1982/1983 : Boa Hora
1983/1984 : GD TAP
1984/1985 : Império Cruzeiro
1985/1986 : FC Gaia
1986/1987 : GS Loures
1987/1988 : AD Fafe
1988/1989 : Ginasio do Sul
1989/1990 : Estrelas da Avenida
1990/1991 : Académico FC
1991/1992 : FC Maia
1992/1993 : Fermentões
1993/1994 : Ginásio Clube de Odivelas
1994/1995 : Juve Lis
1995/1996 : Aguas Santas
1996/1997 : Quintajense
1997/1998 : Fermentões (2)
1998/1999 : Ilhavo AC
1999/2000 : Olivais e Moscavide
2000/2001 : Académico FC (2)
2001/2002 : Sanjoanense
2002/2003 : CDE Camões
2003/2004 : Callidas Clube
2004/2005 : Empregados Comércio
2005/2006 : AC Sismaria
2006/2007 : Evóra AC
2007/2008 : Alto Moinho
2008/2009 : Paço de Arcos

Andebol 3 

Note: 
TN: Titles Number

See Also 

Men's

 Andebol 1 
 Second Division 

 Taça de Portugal
 Supertaça
  Youth Honors

Women's
 First Division
 Taça de Portugal
 Supertaça
  Youth Honors (Women)

References

4
Sports leagues established in 1978
1978 establishments in Portugal
Professional sports leagues in Portugal